Quercus jonesii is a species of oak tree native to Mexico. It is commonly known as palo manzano. It is placed in Quercus section Lobatae.

Description
Quercus jonesii is small tree which typically reaches  in height.

Distribution and habitat
The species is native to the Sierra Madre Occidental, Sierra Madre Oriental, and smaller ranges of the Mexican Plateau in between the two Sierras, in the states of Aguascalientes, Chihuahua, Durango, Guanajuato, northern Jalisco, eastern Nayarit, San Luis Potosí, Nuevo León, Sinaloa, and Sonora

It is found in pine–oak forests, oak forests, and oak and pine–oak woodlands. It typically grows in isolated patches on well-drained rocky slopes in otherwise humid areas. It is often associated with Q. eduardi, Q. resinosa, and Q. laeta.

References

Flora of the Sierra Madre Occidental
Flora of the Sierra Madre Oriental
Endemic oaks of Mexico
jonesii
Taxa named by William Trelease